ON Media Corporation ("Orion Network Media"), is a South Korean broadcasting company. Formerly a subsidiary of Korean food company Orion Confectionery, it was acquired by the CJ Group in 2010. Established in 2000, the company is headquartered in Seongnam, Gyeonggi-do and is a leader in the pay television industry in South Korea. On-Media also delivers cable TV and broadband services.

Television networks

Present 
 Badook TV
 Catch On
 Catch On Plus
 OnStyle
 Ongamenet
 Orion Cinema Network (OCN)
 Story On
 Super Action
 Tooniverse

Former 
 MTV Korea

See also 
 Orion Confectionery

References

External links 
 On-Media - Official Website 

 
CJ E&M
Orion Group subsidiaries
Broadcasting companies of South Korea
South Korean companies established in 2000
Mass media companies established in 2000
Mass media in Seongnam
Companies based in Gyeonggi Province
2010 mergers and acquisitions